Tritonville Football Club was an association football club from Dublin, Ireland. They competed for one season (1912–13) in the Irish League, one of only three Dublin clubs to do so; they also competed in the Irish Cup.

Tritonville played their games on grounds which were used by the GAA on Sundays for Gaelic games; as a result this attracted much controversy from the Belfast-based Irish Football Association who favoured Sabbatarianism.

References

Association football clubs in Dublin (city)
Defunct Irish Football League clubs
Defunct association football clubs in the Republic of Ireland
Former Leinster Senior League clubs
Association football clubs established in 1912
Association football clubs disestablished in 1913
1912 establishments in Ireland
1913 disestablishments in Ireland